David William Jennings (4 June 1889 – 6 August 1918) was an English cricketer who played first-class cricket for Kent County Cricket Club in the years before the First World War. Primarily a batsman, Jennings played in the Kent sides which won the County Championship in 1909, 1910 and 1913.

Jennings served in the Kent Fortress Royal Engineers in the First World War and died as a result of injuries received during his service in August 1918.

Early life
Jennings was born at Kentish Town, then part of Middlesex, in 1889. His parents were David and Isabella Jennings. By 1908 he was employed as the professional cricketer at The Mote in Maidstone when he was taken on to the staff at Kent.

Cricket career
Jennings made his first-class cricket debut for Kent in August 1909 in a County Championship match against Surrey at The Oval. This was his only appearance in the Kent Championship winning side of 1909 and it took until 1912 for him to make more than three appearances in a season for Kent, a County with a particularly strong batting lineup at the time.

In 1911 he led the Kent batting averages, was awarded his county cap and scored his first century in first-class cricket, although he only played in three matches. Seven appearances in 1912 saw him second in the county's averages and he scored another century against Hampshire. He played 11 matches for Kent in both 1913, as the side won the 1913 County Championship, and in 1914. He made his highest score, 106 not out, in 1914 against Essex at Tunbridge Wells. In total Jennings played 35 times for Kent and had a batting average of 24.18. He played his final match in August 1914 against Worcestershire at the St Lawrence Ground in Canterbury.

It is generally considered that if Jennings had been playing in a weaker batting side or had been an amateur that he would have played more frequently. Kent won the County Championship three times during his time with the team and had a policy of picking at least three amateurs, generally batsmen, whenever possible.

Military service and death
Jennings joined the Kent Fortress Royal Engineers during the First World War, enlisting as a private in 1914 and reaching the rank of Second Corporal. He served in the same unit as his Kent teammate Colin Blythe and played alongside Blythe in two matches organised during the war against Australian and South African Imperial Forces at Lord's in 1917.

In May 1917 Jennings was transferred to the Royal Engineers for active service and posted to France in 1918. He was with 206 Field Company, RE near Bienvillers-au-Bois south-west of Arras when he was gassed in April and suffered from shell shock. He was invalided back to England and died of his injuries at Tunbridge Wells in August 1918 aged 29.

Family
Jennings was part of a family with a number of cricketers in it. His father, also David Jennings, played for Devon in the Minor Counties Championship and was later the professional coach and head groundsman at Marlborough College, whilst his younger brothers George and Tom both played first-class cricket after World War I, George for Warwickshire and Tom for Surrey. Both also played for Devon. Another brother Leonard played two first-class matches for the Royal Air Force while yet another, Stanley, played one match for Wiltshire in the Minor Counties Championship.

References

External links
 

English cricketers
Kent cricketers
1889 births
1918 deaths
British Army personnel of World War I
Royal Engineers soldiers
British military personnel killed in World War I
People from Kentish Town
Cricketers from Greater London